The 1923 Open Championship was the 58th Open Championship, held 14–15 June at Troon Golf Club in Troon, South Ayrshire, Scotland. Arthur Havers holed a bunker shot on the 72nd hole to win his only major title, one stroke ahead of defending champion Walter Hagen, who won the following year.

Under the rotation system then in place, the Open should have been held at Muirfield. However some doubt existed "as to the Honourable Company of Edinburgh Golfers being desirous of their course being used for the event" and the Championship was moved to Troon, the first Open Championship to be played there. Troon hosted the Open for the second time in 1950, the first time the Open had been held in southwest Scotland since 1925 at nearby Prestwick.

Qualifying took place on 11–12 June, Monday and Tuesday, with 18 holes on the New (Portland) Course at Troon Golf Club and 18 holes on Troon Municipal Course number 2 (now called Lochgreen). The top eighty and ties qualified.  Albert Tingey Jr., Syd Wingate, and Charles Whitcombe led the field on 146; the qualifying score was 159 and 88 players advanced.

Hagen was among the eleven who just qualified on 159, while future champions Jim Barnes (1925) and Gene Sarazen (1932) both scored 160 and missed out by a stroke. After a 75 on Monday, Sarazen was in the first group out on the New Course on Tuesday morning; they had the worst of the rain and wind, and he shot 85. Sarazen, age 21, already a winner of two majors, had won the Daily Dispatch Northern Professional Championship just ten days earlier at Lytham. Six-time champion Harry Vardon was at 163; it was the first time he did not play in an Open in over thirty years. Wednesday was an idle day.

In the opening round on Thursday morning, Joe Kirkwood led with 72; after the second round that afternoon, Havers and Charles Whitcombe co-led at 146, with Hagen a stroke back. In the two-day format, there was no cut after 36 holes.

Havers carded a third consecutive 73 on Friday morning to carry a two-stroke lead over Hagen into the final round that afternoon. Hagen threatened the lead throughout the round, and when Havers found a bunker on his approach shot at the 18th it appeared as if the door was open for Hagen. Havers, however, chipped in from the bunker to post a 76 for 295. Hagen found the same bunker and needed to hole out to force a 36-hole playoff on Saturday, but his shot narrowly missed and he finished a shot behind Havers. Macdonald Smith finished a stroke behind Hagen in third place.

After his win, Havers made a tour of the United States and defeated both Bobby Jones and Gene Sarazen in match play contests.

Past champions in the field 

Source:

Did not advance past qualifying rounds (Monday & Tuesday):
Harry Vardon (1896, 1898, 1899, 1903, 1911, 1914) 163, Arnaud Massy (1907) 163.

Did not enter:
Jock Hutchison (1921), Jack White (1904),  Harold Hilton (1897).

Venue

This was the first Open at Troon and its Old Course was changed significantly with the addition of sixty new banked-up bunkers.

Round summaries

First round
Thursday, 14 June 1923 (morning)

Source:

Second round
Thursday, 14 June 1923 (afternoon)

Source:

Third round
Friday, 15 June 1923 (morning)

Source:

Final round
Friday, 15 June 1923 (afternoon)

Source:

Amateurs: R. Scott (307), Tolley (313), Soulby (315), Caven (325), E. Scott (328), Watson (330)

References

External links
Royal Troon 1923 (Official site)

The Open Championship
Golf tournaments in Scotland
Open Championship
Open Championship
Open Championship